is a 2015 Japanese science fiction film directed by Sion Sono. The film was released in 2015 and, in March 2016, was played during the Environmental Film Festival at the National Museum of American History, Warner Brothers Theater, in Washington, DC.

Cast
Megumi Kagurazaka

Yūto Ikeda

Production
The Whispering Star was the first film produced by Sion Sono's production company Sion Production. Filming took place in Fukushima Prefecture. Apart from one scene, it is a black-and-white film.

Reception
Richard Gray of thereelbits.com gave the film 4 out of 5 stars, calling it “a wholly unique experience, and an amazing accomplishment in visually-driven storytelling.”

Accolades
The film won the NETPAC Award for World or International Asian Film Premiere at the 2015 Toronto International Film Festival.

References

External links

Japanese science fiction films
2015 science fiction films
Films directed by Sion Sono
Films shot in Fukushima Prefecture
Android (robot) films
Films about artificial intelligence
2010s Japanese films